Agrimonia gryposepala (commonly known as tall hairy agrimony, common agrimony, hooked agrimony, or tall hairy grooveburr<ref>[https://www.itis.gov/servlet/SingleRpt/SingleRpt?search_topic=TSN&search_value=25095 ITIS Standard Report Page: Agrimonia gryposepala] Retrieved 2010-03-13.</ref>) is a small perennial flowering plant of the rose family (Rosaceae), which is native to North America. This plant was used by various indigenous peoples to treat medical problems such as diarrhea and fever.

Name and description
The plant grows 1–5 ft (about 30–150 cm) high, producing a cluster of small, yellow, 5-parted flowers on a hairy stalk above pinnate leaves. The fruits are hooked dry seeds grouped in a cluster. A spicy scent is released when the stem is crushed.Robert W. Freckmann Herbarium University of Wisconsin - Stevens Point  Retrieved 2010-03-13. The plant's native range covers most of the United States and Canada (except the Rocky Mountains) and extending south to Chiapas, Mexico. It grows in woodlands and forests.

The specific epithet, gryposepala, is derived from the Greek grypos, meaning curved or hooked, and from sepala, meaning sepal. The name "grooveburr," which is sometimes applied to the plant, comes from the grooved shape of the seedpod or burr.

Conservation status in the United States
It is listed as threatened in Kentucky.

Uses
Across North America, various indigenous peoples used the plant for medicinal purposes. Among the Iroquois people, a drink made from the roots of the plant was used for diarrhea. Among the Cherokee, the plant was used for the same purpose, to reduce fever, and for a range of other problems. The Ojibwe used the plant for urinary problems, and the Meskwaki and Prairie Potawatomi used it as a styptic for nosebleeds.

These ethnobotanical uses of the plant have some similarities to the traditional medical uses of Agrimonia eupatoria'', which is native to Europe, Asia, and Africa.

References

External links

California Native Plant Link Exchange: Plants that Grow with Agrimonia gryposepala.

gryposepala
Plants used in traditional Native American medicine
Plants described in 1842
Flora of Western Canada
Flora of Eastern Canada
Flora of the United States
Taxa named by Karl Friedrich Wilhelm Wallroth